Freiling is a surname. Notable people with the surname include:

Chris Freiling, American mathematician
Tom Freiling (born 1966), American writer